Titanoeca spominima is a spider species found in Poland.

See also 
 List of Titanoecidae species

References 

Titanoecidae
Spiders of Europe
Spiders described in 1866